General elections were held in the Republic of Serbian Krajina on 12 December 1993, with a second round of the presidential election on 23 January 1994.

Campaign
Martić was supported by Slobodan Milošević during the presidential election in Serbian Krajina. Martić ran for the Serbian Party of Socialists which received significant financial support from Milošević's Socialist Party of Serbia.

Results

President
Milan Martić received 54,000 fewer votes than Milan Babić in the first round, but went on to win the second round with 104,234 votes.

Parliament

References

1993 in Croatia
1994 in Croatia
Elections in Croatia
Serb
Serb
Election and referendum articles with incomplete results